Jacques Claude Marie Vincent de Gournay (28 May 1712, Saint-Malo – 27 June 1759, Cádiz), a French  economist, became an intendant of commerce.  Some historians of economics believe that he coined the phrase laissez faire, laissez passer. Evidence was to be found when the French State parted the West Indies Company privilege - monopoly - on the slave trade. He is also credited with coining the term  "bureaucracy". Together with  François Quesnay, whose disciple he was, he was a leader of the Physiocratic School.

Gournay's father was Claude Vincent, a merchant in Saint-Malo as well as a secretary to the king.  Gournay didn't write much, but had a great influence on French economic thought through his conversations with many important theorists.  He became instrumental in popularizing the work of Richard Cantillon in France.

Gournay was appointed an intendant du commerce in 1751.  One of the main themes of his term in office was his opposition to government regulations because of what he saw as the way they stunted commerce.  He coined the term bureaucratie (literally "government by desks") to describe the situation.  Gournay's disdain for government regulation of commerce influenced his disciple  Turgot.  

Gournay's first name is often mistakenly given as "Jean", due to an error made by Turgot in his letter to Jean-François Marmontel known as In Praise of Gournay.

A street in Saint-Malo, the Rue Vincent-de-Gournay, takes its name from him.

References 

1712 births
1759 deaths
French classical liberals
Physiocrats
18th-century French economists